Sandilands may refer to:

People
Clan Sandilands, a lowland Scottish kindred
Sandilands is the surname of the Lords Torphichen, chief of Clan Sandilands
Sandilands was the surname of Lords Abercrombie
Aaron Sandilands, Australian rules football player
Catriona Sandilands, is a Canadian writer
James Walter Sandilands, British Army officer
Kyle Sandilands, Australian radio host
Neil Sandilands, South African actor

Places
Sandilands, Lincolnshire, a hamlet on the East coast of England
Sandilands tram stop, a stop on London's Tramlink light rail system
Sandilands Provincial Forest in southeastern Manitoba, Canada
Sandilands, South Australia, a locality on Yorke Peninsula

Other
Sandilands Community Primary School, in Manchester, England